Jason John "JJ" Adams (born March 1978) is an English mixed media contemporary pop artist and graphic designer.

Life
Adams was born in Plymouth, England in March 1978, the son of a Baptist minister. The first of three children, he attended Oswald Road Primary School in Chorlton in Manchester before moving with his parents to Cape Town, South Africa at the age of 6 in 1984. 

There he studied at various schools as his family moved between Bloemfontein and Cape Town, where they finally settled for the next 13 years. He was sent to boarding school in Graaff Reinet at age 13 after a few years of failing to perform academically. 

Adams has been described as a rebellious child. His father had also attended boarding school as a youth and went on to become head boy and captain of the 1st rugby team at Fish Hoek high school in Cape Town. This was the hope for Adams, but it was not to be. He was under pressure to achieve and ended up being expelled from boarding school.

During his schooling he was held back a total of two years. He attended Bergvliet High school to finally obtain his GCSE equivalent in order to get into art college. He studied graphic design at Cape College, where he found he excelled at things like screenprinting and early computer design. 

He worked backstage as a concert crew member for international bands that toured Cape Town after Apartheid had ended. He worked with the likes of Inxs, Bon Jovi, Def Leppard, ZZ Top and Michael Jackson. 

While living in Cape Town he also worked in Wildfire Tattoos tattoo parlour, which he says influenced his interests. He was interested in music, and played guitar in a band as a teenager. He was into skateboarding and graffiti, and was arrested for painting the side of a building in Cape Town. His work would later feature graffiti and street art as well as his tattoo and musical influences. JJ's family returned to Plymouth, England in 1998.

A few years later he was kicked out of art college after smashing a window with an electric guitar and refusing to sit an Afrikaans language exam which he felt he didn't need in order to obtain an art diploma.

Adams decided to move to London to become a tattoo artist. He describes giving up the dream when he "realised it wasn't what I was meant to be" after meeting London's tattoo godfather Lal Hardy and being scared off. Years later, Hardy would become a collector of Adams' work.

After several drug fuelled years working in London's Camden Market and being an assistant manager in a retail shop in Covent Garden, at the age of 24 Adams returned to Plymouth where he enrolled at Plymouth College of Art & Design to study commercial printing. He then worked for a commercial printing company where he worked on magazine layout and in the pre-press department exposing screens and plates for the lithographic printing presses.

Shortly after, Adams started his own commercial sign and graphic design business while working on art in his spare time.

In 2009 after selling a few of his acrylic paintings through a local gallery he decided it was time to move back to London and pursue his art career.

Work

Adams' work can be found in galleries in the UK, US and Canada, he has done exhibitions with the likes of Rolls-Royce and Bang & Olufsen, and has been featured in magazines such as Vogue and GQ. 

He describes his work as a simple formula of remixing old with something new. He uses a range of mixed media formats including spray painting, hand painting in acrylics, screen printing, collage, digital matte painting and photography.

His work features elements of graffiti, street art, tattoos and celebrity icons. Adams has developed his own unique style of hiding many things in his paintings, a style that he learned from his father and a jigsaw puzzle he loved as a child, as well spending many hours studying album covers from bands like Iron Maiden and Pink Floyd. As a child and teenager, Adams always hid things in his drawings.

Adams has curated bespoke artworks for two high-profile London restaurants, Hyde in Kensington and The Frog by Adam Handling in Covent Garden. His work is collected by celebrities and famous musicians such as Slash from Guns N' Roses and Shaun Ryder of the Happy Mondays. His work has also been featured on television shows such as Made in Chelsea, Britain's Next Top Model and Through the Keyhole.

Adams says his biggest influence is South African artist Derric Van Rensburg alongside other artists such as Storm Thorgerson, Norman Rockwell, Roy Lichtenstein, Andy Warhol and Sir Peter Blake. Most of his inspiration comes from film, television, music and life experience. He always listens to music while he works and is an avid record collector. His favourite band is Pink Floyd.

Personal life

Adams is married with five children and lives in South London. He is shy and keeps his personal life private and away from social media. 

Through the sale of his work, Adams donates to many charities in the UK. A 20cm x 20cm painting of his raised over £5,000 for a charity at auction in 2015.

References

External links 
 Official website

Living people
1978 births
Artists from Plymouth, Devon
British pop artists